Milker may refer to:

Automatic milking, milk extraction from dairy animals via a machine
Milkmaid, a person who milks animals
An animal that yields milk, in a dairy
Dairy cattle, cows bred for their milk production